Cherinet Hariffo (born June 2, 2001) is an Ethiopian social activist. He founded Youth for Sustainable Development 2030, a non-governmental organization that works to educate young people on Sustainable Development Objectives (SDGs) and gives young people the option to participate in a United Nations initiative that aims to speed up the achievement of global goals. Hariffo Also established Human Rights Global, an organization that works to combat the infringement of human rights all across the world and encourages young people to fight for social justice. In addition to being a member of the East African Youth Association, Cherinet has held the positions of vice president and secretary within that organization. Additionally, Hariffo is an advocate for those who have been forced to escape their home countries, and he also works to ensure that refugees all across the globe have access to educational opportunities.

Early life

Cherinet was born on June 2, 2001, in Ethiopia, As an ethnic Tigrayan. As a child, he moved to Kenya as a refugee in 2012 and lived in Kakuma Refugee Camp. Hariffo fled to Kenya in 2012 at the age of eight alone from his native country, Ethiopia, due to a lack of security and better education. He later attended school at Valley Bridge Primary in Nairobi and also worked part-time as an animal keeper in the Kariobangi area of northeastern Nairobi.

He graduated from Lower Merion High School.

Hariffo has been involved in the United Nations Youth Program and several local advocacy programs from a young age.

Human rights and social advocacy

Hariffo has been an active member of a number of community-based groups, notably the movement to end the genocide of the Tigray people. He has established a protest and advocacy group with the intention of bringing more attention to the crisis that was also unfolding in Northern Ethiopia. He has participated in protests and initiatives against genocide and violations of human rights that have taken place on a global scale. In parallel to this, he has been an outspoken advocate for human rights groups before the United Nations and the Congress of the United States of America, and he has also been influential in the development of new policies on refugee rights, human rights, peace, and conflict.

Hariffo is involved in the UNICEF Unite program that works with youth in the United States, Africa, and Europe. He has also advocated for the prevention of child trafficking in Kenya, Ethiopia, Somalia, and Eritrea. He also focuses on the Tigray crisis in Ethiopia.

Media

Eye on Tigray

Personal life
Hariffo speaks more than five languages and often translates and interprets for refugees who do not speak English.

References

External links
Official website
Advocate For Refugees
United Nation Youth
https://news.un.org/sw/tags/cherinet-harifo

Living people
2001 births
Ethiopian emigrants to the United States
People from Tigray Region
Ethiopian refugees
Refugees in Kenya